Thomas Ambrose (born 19 October 1939) is a Canadian singer-songwriter.

Tommy Ambrose was born in Toronto, Ontario, Canada. At age four he began gospel singing at "Youth for Christ" rallies at Massey Hall, Maple Leaf Gardens, and elsewhere under the direction of Charles B. Templeton. Until he was sixteen he performed on gospel radio shows on 590 CKEY and 1010 CFRB. Turning to popular music he made his CBC TV debut on Cross-Canada Hit Parade. Shortly after that he hosted While We’re Young (summer replacement show) which then became The Tommy Ambrose Show for CBC television.

After several years of nightclub work, accompanied by pianist Norm Amadio, Tommy started singing radio and television commercials where he was discovered by Phil Ramone, world-renowned sound engineer – record producer and Patrick Williams – composer of many hit movie scores. He then sang in jingle studios in New York City for the next three years.

Ambrose then formed Trudel Productions with partner Larry Trudel – and through his own PC Productions he has written many successful jingles such as, "Blue Smiles Along with You" – Labatt Blue, "Wear a Mustache" – Milk, "Get Crackin" – Eggs (with lyricist Gary Gray, and others) plus a theme song for Global TV ("Point of View" with lyrics by Gray). 

Ambrose was also commissioned by Canadian media icon Moses Znaimer to write a theme song for his fledgling TV station Citytv. Ambrose, working again with Gary Gray, came up with the song "People's City", which became something of an anthem not just for the station but also the city of Toronto. Ambrose, Znaimer, former Toronto mayor David Crombie and others later appeared in a documentary about the song, produced by Ed Conroy's Retrontario operation.

Tommy wrote and performed the theme song "Open up the Dome and let the People Come In" for the opening of Skydome (lyrics by Bill Gough) – see video, CTV’s Barcelona Olympic Theme Song "There are No Strangers" sung by Michael Burgess and several theme songs for CBC TV movies. During these years Ambrose starred in the CBC's gospel series "Celebration" on radio and on television. Blaik Kirby in the Toronto Globe and Mail wrote of Ambrose's singing: "His lean-sounding voice is invariably in tune, his notes beautifully sustained and focused. There is a marvelous feeling of security as you listen." Tommy also performed occasionally in clubs and concerts with a nine piece band led by Doug Riley.

In the 1980s Ambrose did yet another TV series for CBC "Tommy Ambrose AND FRIENDS" featuring a 35 piece orchestra with great guests like Jack Sheldon-James Moody-Sue Rainy.

Tommy was the proprietor of Jingles, a downtown Toronto bar that he appeared at regularly with the nine piece band led by Riley and on occasion presented many different jazz groups. In the mid 1990s Ambrose moved to "Niagara on the Lake" where he started to develop a show "Songs Sinatra Taught Me" with writer Frank Peppiatt creator and writer of "A Man And His Music" for Sinatra – Ambrose performed this show in theatres in Toronto and across Ontario in the late 1990s into 2000.

Ambrose was nominated for a Juno Award in 1981 in the Best Jazz Album category for his album, Tommy Ambrose at Last, with the Doug Riley Band.

Discography

Albums

Singles

Filmography
This list is incomplete
 1957: Cross-Canada Hit Parade (CBC)
 1961–1963: The Tommy Ambrose Show
 1972: Hee Haw
 1975–1976: Celebration'' (CBC)

References

External links
 CanadianBands.com entry – Tommy Ambrose
Jam! – The Canadian Pop Encyclopedia: Tommy Ambrose
The Canadian Encyclopedia: Tommy Ambrose
CBC Television Series: Tommy Ambrose Show
1050 CHUM Photo Gallery: "Tommy Ambrose – 1950s"
"People's City" - Tommy Ambrose documentary

1939 births
Living people
Canadian male singer-songwriters
Canadian country singer-songwriters
Musicians from Toronto